The 1983 RTHK Top 10 Gold Songs Awards was held in 1983 for the 1982 music season.

Top 10 song awards
The top 10 songs (十大中文金曲) of 1983 are as follows.

Other awards

References
 RTHK top 10 gold song awards 1983

RTHK Top 10 Gold Songs Awards
Rthk Top 10 Gold Songs Awards, 1983
Rthk Top 10 Gold Songs Awards, 1983